Raysko Praskalo ("Heavenly Sprinkler"), 124.5 m in height, is the highest permanent waterfall in Bulgaria and one of the highest in the Balkan Peninsula. It is situated under Botev Peak (2,376 m) in the central section of the Balkan Mountains and is part of the Dzhendema Reserve of the Central Balkan National Park. The nearest town is Kalofer, at 11 km to the south.

The waterfall takes water from the snow drifts on Botev Peak and forms the river Praskalska which is a tributary to the Byala Reka River. The flow of fall is at its peak during summer.

In the foothills of Raysko Praskalo is located the 120-bed Ray mountain refuge which is the starting point for the tourist trails to the waterfall.

Footnotes

External links

 

Waterfalls of Bulgaria
Balkan mountains
Landforms of Plovdiv Province